Namphan Township, also known as Na-hpan, is a township of the Wa Self-Administered Division of Shan State, formerly and conterminously part of Matman District. Prior to 2011, it was part of Hopang District and Lashio District. Its capital is Namphan.

Demographics
The total population before 1995 was 48,466 and 37,024 of them were Wa people.

References

Geography of Shan State
Wa people